Yxlö may refer to:

 Yxlö, Nynäshamn Municipality - an island in the Stockholm archipelago and Nynäshamn Municipality, Stockholm County, Sweden
  - a settlement on the island of Yxlan in the Stockholm archipelago and Norrtälje Municipality, Stockholm County, Sweden